Telem can be any of the following:

In the Hebrew Bible:
a porter of the temple in the time of Ezra (10:24).
a town in the southern border of Judah (Josh. 15:24); probably the same as Telaim.
Telem (1981 political party), a former political party in modern Israel
Telem, Har Hebron, a Jewish communal settlement in the West Bank
Benjamin Telem, Israeli Major General and Commander of the Navy
Telem (2019 political party), an active Israeli political party